The Diocese of Escuintla  is a Latin Church ecclesiastical territory or diocese of the Catholic Church in Guatemala. It is a suffragan diocese in the ecclesiastical province of the metropolitan Archdiocese of Guatemala. The Diocese of Escuintla was erected on 28 July 1994 from a territorial prelature.

Its cathedral is Catedral Nuestra Señora de Concepción, in the episcopal see of Escuintla.

History 
It was established on 1969.05.09 as a Territorial Prelature of Escuintla on territory split off from the Archdiocese of Guatemala, which remains its metropolitan. On 28 July 1994 it was promoted to diocese.

Bishops

Episcopal ordinaries
 Territorial Prelates of Escuintla 
 José Julio Aguilar García (1969.05.09 – 1972.11.02), Titular Bishop of Bononia (1970.12.05 – 1972.11.02), later Bishop of Santa Cruz de la Sierra (Bolivia) (1972.11.02 – 1974.08.22)
 Mario Enrique Ríos Montt, Lazarists (C.M.) (1974.07.13 – 1984.03.03), Titular Bishop of Tiguala (1974.07.13 – ...); later Auxiliary Bishop of Guatemala (Guatemala) (1987.01.24 – 2010.10.02) and Apostolic Administrator of Izabal (Guatemala) (2011.07.26 – 2013.02.09)
 Fernando Claudio Gamalero González (1986.03.13 – 1994.07.28 see below)

 Suffragan Bishops of Escuintla 
 Fernando Claudio Gamalero González ( see above 1994.07.28 – death 2004.04.03)
 Victor Hugo Palma Paúl (2004.04.03 – ), succeeded as previous Coadjutor Bishop of Escuintla (2001.07.14 – 2004.04.03)

Coadjutor bishop
Victor Hugo Palma Paúl (2001-2004)

Sources, External links and references
 with incumbent biography links
 

Escuintla
Escuintla
Escuintla
Roman Catholic Ecclesiastical Province of Santiago de Guatemala